This is a list of cast members of the A Nightmare on Elm Street film series. The film series began in 1984 with the release of the first film A Nightmare on Elm Street which was directed and written by Wes Craven. Although Craven disliked the idea of sequels, he returned to co-write the third film, Dream Warriors (1987) and to write and direct the seventh film, New Nightmare (1994). The main character of the films, Freddy Krueger appeared throughout the entire franchise portrayed by Robert Englund, until the remake (2010), when the character was portrayed by Jackie Earle Haley, who auditioned for the role of Glen Lantz in the original. Rooney Mara takes the role of Nancy Thompson, a character portrayed by Heather Langenkamp in the first, third and seventh films.

Cast

See also 
 List of characters in the Nightmare on Elm Street series

References

External links 
 

Nightmare on Elm Street, A
A Nightmare on Elm Street (franchise) lists